The Nerillidae are a family of invertebrates containing these genera:
 Meganerilla
 Mesonerilla
 Nerilla
 Nerillidium
 Nerillidopsis
 Paranerilla
 Psammoriedlia
 Thalassochaetus
 Troglochaetus

References

Polychaetes
Annelid families